Mada is a regionally important language spoken in Nasarawa and southern Kaduna States of Middle Belt, Nigeria, with many dialects. It is a highly tonal language. A translation of the New Testament into the language was finished in 1999. The Nunku language has been identified to be a dialect of Mada rather than of the Gbantu language. 

The Mada people are the second most populated tribe in Nasarawa state, mostly populating Akwanga and Kokona local governments. Possible archaeological history suggests that they may be descendants of the Nok civilization. They are closely related to the Ninzo people, as well as to the Gbantu people. Their languages are believed to be descended from the Proto-Plateau language.

References

Languages of Nigeria
Tonal languages
Ninzic languages